Leeroy Mavunga (born 6 December 1998) is a Zimbabwean footballer who plays as a midfielder for CAPS United F.C. and the Zimbabwe national football team.

International career

International goals
Scores and results list Zimbabwe's goal tally first.

References

External links

1998 births
Living people
Zimbabwe Premier Soccer League players
Zimbabwean footballers
Zimbabwe international footballers
Association football midfielders
Yadah Stars F.C. players
Zimbabwe A' international footballers
2020 African Nations Championship players
CAPS United players